Audefroi le Bastart (modern French Bâtard) was a French trouvère from Artois, who flourished in the early thirteenth century.

Of his life nothing is known, though he is certainly the illegitimate child of a noble or upper-class bourgeoisie family, but his family is not to be identified with the noble family Arras or with the bourgeoisie family of Louchart, also from Arras; Audefroi himself is not to be identified with Gautier d'Arras. The Seigneur de Nesles, to whom some of his songs are addressed, is probably the Châtelain of Bruges who joined the Fourth Crusade.

Audefroi was the author of ten chansons d'amour and five chansons de toile: "Argentine," "Belle Idoine," "Belle Isabeau," "Belle Emmelos," and "Biatrix." These five follow older chansons in subject, but the smoothness of the verse and beauty of detail readily compensate for the spontaneity of the shorter form.

References

12th-century French writers
French poets
Medieval French literature
Trouvères
13th-century French poets
French male poets
Male classical composers